Marie-Claude Morin (born January 25, 1985 in Trois-Rivières, Quebec) is a Canadian politician, who was elected to the House of Commons of Canada in the 2011 election. She represented the electoral district of Saint-Hyacinthe—Bagot as a member of the New Democratic Party for one term.

Early life
Morin pursued her post-secondary education at the Université du Québec à Montréal where she was a social work student.

Political career
Morin ran for a seat to the House of Commons of Canada in the electoral district of Saint-Hyacinthe—Bagot under the New Democratic Party of Canada banner in the 2011 Canadian federal election. She defeated incumbent Ève-Mary Thaï Thi Lac and future Canadian Senator Jean-Guy Dagenais as well as two other candidates to win her first term in office.  In 2014 she announced she would not seek re-election for health and personal reasons.

References

External links
Official Website

1985 births
Women members of the House of Commons of Canada
Living people
Members of the House of Commons of Canada from Quebec
New Democratic Party MPs
People from Trois-Rivières
Université du Québec à Montréal alumni
21st-century Canadian politicians
21st-century Canadian women politicians